Vitalia Doumesh (born April 29, 1965, Latvian SSR, USSR) is a Soviet, Latvian and Dutch draughts player (International draughts, English draughts and Turkish draughts). Many time champion of Latvia and the Netherlands (1997, 2015, 2017). Women's International grandmaster (GMIF).

Biography
Doumesh lived and worked as a software engineer in Latvian capital Riga during the 80s . Since 1995 she has lived in the Netherlands (Alkmaar), She is a teacher at Transcendental Meditation, translator from Dutch, Russian and English.

Sports achievements

International draughts

World Championship
 1997 (6 place))
 1999 (15 place)
 2003 (7 place)
 2005 (7 place)
 2007 (11 place)
 2011 (11 place)
 2017 (7 place)

European Championship
 2002 (4 place)
 2004 (12 place)
 2006 (9 place)
 2008 (13 place)
 2000 (8 place)
 2012 (23 place)
 2014 (15 place)
 2016 (14 place)

English draughts

World Championship
 2013 (4 place)
 2014 (2 place)
 2016 (5 place)

Turkish draughts

World Championship
 2014 (35 place and 3 place in the team classification)

References

External links
World Championship Women 1973 - 2011
Pfofile, FMJD
Pfofile, KNDB

1965 births
Living people
Soviet draughts players
Latvian draughts players
Dutch draughts players
Players of international draughts